Cornufer bufonulus is a species of frog in the family Ceratobatrachidae. It is endemic to the Nakanai Mountains on New Britain Island in Papua New Guinea.

This frog burrows into the leaf litter.

References

Frogs of Asia
Amphibians described in 2007
Endemic fauna of Papua New Guinea
bufonulus